Panula may refer to:

 Eino Viljami Panula (1911–1912), young Finnish boy who died during the sinking of the RMS Titanic
 Jorma Panula (born 1930), Finnish conductor, composer, and teacher of conducting
 Panula (moth), a genus of moths found in Mexico and the Dominican Republic
 , Finland
 Panula (tree), a timber tree of South and Central America, Quararibea asterolepis